Jan Štych (born 27 December 1935 in Trutnov) is a Czech conductor. He is best known for his conducting of the operas of Janáček.

References

1935 births
Living people
Musicians from Hradec Králové
Czech conductors (music)
Male conductors (music)
21st-century conductors (music)
21st-century Czech male musicians